Ribeirão Manuel is a village in the western part of the island of Santiago, Cape Verde. In 2010 its population was 1,086.  It is situated 2 km north of Chã de Tanque and 4 km west of Assomada. The elevation is about 415 meters above sea level.

References

Villages and settlements in Santiago, Cape Verde
Santa Catarina, Cape Verde